Roger Daniel Kelemen is a scholar of law and political science who holds the Jean Monnet Chair at Rutgers University.

Works

References

21st-century political scientists
Rutgers University faculty
European Union and European integration scholars
American people of Hungarian-Jewish descent
Year of birth missing (living people)
Living people